LSD-Pip is a compound from the ergoline family, related to LSD but with the N,N-diethyl substitution replaced by a piperidine group. It is more potent than the corresponding pyrrolidine and morpholine analogues (LPD-824 and LSM-775 respectively), but is still several times less potent than LSD as a 5-HT2A agonist. Early studies suggested this compound to be inactive as a psychedelic in humans, though this does not seem to have been confirmed by any more recent work.

See also 
 Lysergic acid 2-butyl amide
 Lysergic acid 2,4-dimethylazetidide

References 

Lysergamides
Serotonin receptor agonists
1-Piperidinyl compounds